The Rt. Rev. Masilamani Azariah (1934 - 2012) was an Indian bishop in the  20th century: he was the Bishop of Madras from 1990 to 1999. The Church of South India Synod announced his death in 2012.

Notes

 

1934 births
2012 deaths
20th-century Anglican bishops in India
Indian bishops
Indian Christian religious leaders
Anglican bishops of Madras